Ladik or Lâdik may refer to one of several cities and towns in Turkey and geographical features:

 Ladik, Samsun Province, the ancient Laodicea Pontica
 Ladik Lake, lake in Samsun Province
 Denizli Ladik, usually called just Denizli, near Laodicea on the Lycus
 Beylik of Ladik: 14th century Anatolian beylik, also called İnançoğlu, founded in Denizli and surroundings, in Turkey's Aegean Region